Glanzmann is a surname. Notable people with the surname include:

Andrei Glanzmann (1907–1988), Romanian footballer
Chrigel Glanzmann (born 1975), Swiss musician
Fredy Glanzmann (born 1963), Swiss Nordic combined skier
Ida Glanzmann (born 1958), Swiss politician

See also
Sam Glanzman (1924–2017), American comics artist